The 2003 Redditch Borough Council election took place on 1 May 2003 to elect members of Redditch Borough Council in the West Midlands region, England. One third of the council was up for election and the council stayed under no overall control.

After the election, the composition of the council was:
Conservative 14
Labour 10
Liberal Democrat 5

Campaign
The Conservative Party was hoping to gain control over the council, which before the election was controlled by Labour with the support of the Liberal Democrats. 10 seats were being contested with the Labour party defending 6 of the seats. Labour needed to gain one seat to regain their majority, while the Conservatives needed 3 gains to also win a majority. The key wards targeted by the Conservatives were Central, Greenlands and Lodge Park.

The Conservatives were hoping to gain from voters who were unhappy over council tax rises and they pledged to only increase it by the inflation rate over the next three years if they won control. Meanwhile, Labour pledged to use new powers to tackle anti-social behaviour and said they were making a difference in the town. Other issues raised in the election included an Audit Commission report on the housing department and the poor use of tourist attractions in the borough.

Election result
The results saw the Labour party lose four seats, two each to the Conservatives and Liberal Democrats. The Liberal Democrats gained in Church Hill and Winyates, while the Conservatives gained Central and Greenlands. Among the Labour losses was the wife of the Labour leader, Helen Cartwright, and the planning committee chairman, Clive Cheetham. The new Conservative councillor from Central ward, Mohammed Farooqui, became the youngest member of the council at the age of 24.

As a result, the Conservatives became the largest party on the council with 14 seats. They had only just missed winning a majority on the council after failing to gain Lodge Park by 64 votes.

Ward results

References

2003
2003 English local elections
2000s in Worcestershire